Avenue Supermarts Limited, d/b/a DMart, is an Indian retail corporation that operates a chain of hypermarkets in India. It was founded by Radhakishan Damani in 2002 when its first store was opened in Powai, Mumbai. As of December 2022, it has 306 stores across 14 states in India.

The company has its headquarters in Mumbai. As of 31 March 2022, DMart had a total of 10,713 permanent employees and 58,597 employees hired on contractual basis.

History

In December 2016, the company started its e-commerce venture called DMart Ready, allowing users to order groceries and household products online.

The company launched its initial public offering (IPO) in March 2017 and got listed on the National Stock Exchange and Bombay Stock Exchange. On its listing date 22 March 2017, it became the 65th most valuable Indian firm.

Subsidiaries 
Avenue Food Plaza Pvt Ltd
Align Retail Traders Pvt Ltd
Avenue E-Commerce Ltd
Nahar Seth & Jogani Developers Private Limited
Reflect Wholesale And Retail Private Limited

See also
 List of hypermarkets

References

External links
 

Indian companies established in 2002
Companies based in Mumbai
Hypermarkets
Retail companies established in 2002
Supermarkets of India
2002 establishments in Maharashtra
Companies listed on the National Stock Exchange of India
Companies listed on the Bombay Stock Exchange